Nebřehovice is a municipality and village in Strakonice District in the South Bohemian Region of the Czech Republic. It has about 200 inhabitants.

Administrative parts
The village of Zadní Ptákovice is an administrative part of Nebřehovice.

References

Villages in Strakonice District